Hatton is a village and civil parish in the Borough of Warrington in Cheshire, England, south of the town of Warrington.  It contains three buildings that are recorded in the National Heritage List for England as designated listed buildings, all of which are at Grade II.  This is the lowest of the three gradings given to listed buildings, applied to "buildings of national importance and special interest".  The parish is entirely rural, and the listed buildings consist of a house, a public house, and a telephone kiosk.

See also
Listed buildings in Appleton
Listed buildings in Runcorn (rural area)
Listed buildings in Stretton
Listed buildings in Walton
Listed buildings in Whitley

References

Listed buildings in Warrington
Lists of listed buildings in Cheshire